Arturo Silvestri (14 June 1921 – 14 October 2002) was an Italian professional footballer and football manager, who played as a defender.

Honours

Club 
A.C. Milan
Serie A: 1950–51, 1954–55
Latin Cup: 1951

Manager 
Cagliari
Serie C: 1961–62 (girone B)
A.C. Milan
Coppa Italia: 1966–67
Genoa
Serie B: 1972–73
Serie C: 1970–71 (girone B)

References

External links 
Profile at MagliaRossonera.it 

International caps at FIGC.it 

1921 births
2002 deaths
Italian footballers
Italian football managers
Association football defenders
Serie A players
Serie B players
ACF Fiorentina players
Modena F.C. players
A.C. Milan players
Hellas Verona F.C. players
U.S. Livorno 1915 managers
Cagliari Calcio managers
A.C. Milan managers
L.R. Vicenza managers
Brescia Calcio managers
Genoa C.F.C. managers
S.S.D. Lucchese 1905 managers
Italy international footballers